Irene is a 2009 French drama film directed by Alain Cavalier. It competed in the Un Certain Regard section at the 2009 Cannes Film Festival.

References

External links

2009 films
2000s French-language films
2009 drama films
Films directed by Alain Cavalier
French drama films
2000s French films